The following is a timeline of the history of the city of Ancona in the Marche region of Italy.

Prior to 18th century

 390 BCE – Greek colony founded by Syracusans (approximate date).
 268 BCE – Romans in power.
 1st century BCE – Ancona becomes a municipium.
 115 CE – Arch of Trajan erected.
 4th–5th century CE – Roman Catholic diocese of Ancona established.
 5th century – Basilica of San Lorenzo built.(it)
 539 – Ancona besieged by Gothic forces.
 551 – Ancona besieged by Gothic forces under Totila.
 728 – Duke of Spoleto in power.
 774 – Ancona "given to the pope by Charlemagne."
 848 – Ancona sacked by Saracen forces.
 1128 – Ancona Cathedral consecrated.
 1167 – Naval blockade of Ancona by the Venetians.
 1173 – Ancona besieged by Venetian forces.
 1183 – Ancona attacked by Venetian forces.
 1208 – Azzo VI of Este in power in the Marches.
 1210 – Santa Maria della Piazza church remodelled.
 1221 – Porta della Farina (gate) built.
 1229 – Ancona attacked by Venetian forces.
 1257 – Ancona attacked by Venetian forces.
 1258 – Manfred, King of Sicily in power in the Marches.
 1274 – Ancona attacked by Venetian forces.
 1323 – San Francesco alle Scale church founded.
 1357 – Marches-related Constitutiones marchiae anconitanae (law) issued.
 1400 – Public clock installed (approximate date).
 1428 – Ancona attacked by Venetian forces.
 1442 – Loggia dei Mercanti construction begins.
 1493 –  construction begins.
 1532 – Ancona becomes part of the Papal States.
 1543 –  (fort) built.
 1605 –  (church) construction begins.

18th–19th centuries
 1732 – Free port status granted.
 1737 –  erected.
 1738
 Lazzaretto of Ancona built.
 1749 – Biblioteca comunale Luciano Benincasa (library) established.
 1789 –  (gate) built.
 1797
 French forces take Ancona.
 Anconine Republic established.
 1799 – Austrians take Ancona.
 1801 – French retake Ancona.
 1827 –  (theatre) opens.
 1843 – Cantiere navale di Ancona (shipyard) active.
 1849 – Ancona besieged by Austrian forces.
 1860
 September: Sardinian forces take Ancona.
 Corriere Adriatico newspaper begins publication.
 Ancona Lighthouse on the Colle dei Cappuccini begins operating.
  (provincial district) established.
 1861 – Ancona railway station opens; Bologna–Ancona railway begins operating.
 1863 – Ancona–Pescara railway begins operating.
 1866
 Ancona–Orte railway begins operating.
 Adriatic fleet headquarters relocated from Ancona to Venice.
 1868 –  constructed.
 1876 –  built.
 1880 – "Southern quay" built in the port.
 1881 –  begins operating.
 1897 – Population: 58,088.

20th century

 1905 – Unione Sportiva Anconitana (football club) formed.
 1911 – Population: 63,100.
 1914 – June: Unrest during "Red Week".
 1915 – Naval Bombardment of Ancona during World War I.
 1918 – April: Attempted .
 1920 – Military .
 1929 – Ancona Airport built.
 1943 –  during World War II.
 1944 – Battle of Ancona.
 1949 – Trolleybus system begins operating.
 1961 –  (theatre) built.
 1969 – Università degli Studi di Ancona active.
 1972 – An earthquake swarm included two destructive events that caused extensive damage. A magnitude 4.4 event (intensity VIII (Severe)) occurred on February 4 and a magnitude 4.9 event (intensity IX (Violent)) occurred on June 14.
 1982 – December: Landslide.(it)
 1992 – Stadio del Conero (stadium) opens.

21st century

 2003 – Marche Polytechnic University active.
 2005 –  (park) opens.
 2013
 Local election held; Valeria Mancinelli becomes mayor.
 Population: 100,343.
 2015 – May: Marche regional election, 2015 held.

See also
 
 List of mayors of Ancona
 List of bishops of Ancona
 History of the Jews in Ancona
 
  (region)

Other cities in the macroregion of Central Italy:(it)
 Timeline of Arezzo, Tuscany region
 Timeline of Florence, Tuscany 
 Timeline of Livorno, Tuscany
 Timeline of Lucca, Tuscany
 Timeline of Perugia, Umbria region
 Timeline of Pisa, Tuscany
 Timeline of Pistoia, Tuscany
 Timeline of Prato, Tuscany
 Timeline of Rome, Lazio region
 Timeline of Siena, Tuscany

References

This article incorporates information from the Italian Wikipedia.

Bibliography

in English

in Italian

  15th century
 
 
  (bibliography)

External links

 Archivio di Stato di Ancona (state archives)
 Items related to Ancona, various dates (via Europeana)
 Items related to Ancona, various dates (via Digital Public Library of America)

Ancona
Ancona